This is a list of speedway teams in Sweden.

By league 

 Elitserien
 Allsvenskan
 Division 1

Alphabetically

B 
Bajen Speedway
Bysarna

D 
Dackarna

E 
Eldarna
Elit Vetlanda Speedway

F 
Filbyterna

G 
Gamarna
Getingarna
Gnistorna
Griparna
SMK Gävle

I 
Hammarby Speedway

I 
Indianerna

J 
Jämtarna

K 
Kaparna

L 
Lejonen
Lindarna

M 
Masarna

N 
Nässjö SK

P 
Piraterna

R 
Rospiggarna

S 
Smålänningarna
Smederna
Solkatterna
Speedway 054

T 
Team Bikab
Team Canvac
Team Dalakraft
Team Dalej
Team Kumla Pro

V 
Valsarna
Vargarna
Vikingarna Speedway
Västervik Speedway

Ö 
Örnarna

 
Speedway teams